Amas de Casa Desesperadas is an American dramedy television series that aired on Univision from January 10, 2008, to June 19, 2008. It is a Spanish-language adaption of Desperate Housewives, created by Marc Cherry.

Set in the fictional Manzanares Street, the series follows the lives of four housewives and the domestic problems and daily mysteries surrounding their husbands, friends and neighbors, which can be more sinister than they appear. The series' tone combines elements of drama, comedy, mystery, farce, soap opera and satire.

Plot
The show opens with the mysterious suicide of housewife Alicia Arizmendi on a beautiful day in the suburbs, on a street called Manzanares. Alicia, who narrates the show from the afterlife, had four friends: Regina Sotomayor, the seemingly-perfect mother of two teenagers struggling to save her marriage; Leonor Guerrero, the mother of four whose husband is always away on business; Susana Martinez, the divorced mother in search of love, who finds it in the form of her new neighbour Miguel Santini, who has a secret of his own; and Gabriela Solís, the materialistic ex-runway model who cheats on her husband. While trying to be good wives and mothers, the four friends also try to find out why their friend committed suicide. The discovery of a blackmail note among Alicia's belongings, a therapy session tape in which she admits her real name was Angela, and her widowed husband's strange behaviour really make them wonder about the mystery surrounding their deceased friend.

Cast
 Scarlet Ortiz as Susana Martinez
 Lorna Paz as Leonor Guerrero
 Julieta Rosen as Regina Sotomayor
 Ana Serradilla as Gabriela Solis
 Gabriela Vergara as Roxana Guzman
 Bernie Paz as Carlos Solis 
 Lucía Méndez as Alicia Arizmendi
 Diego Bertie as Antonio Guerrero
 Riccardo Dalmacci as Roberto Sotomayor
 Diego Ramos as Miguel Santini
 Betiana Blum as Marta López

Production 
On May 14, 2007, Univision signed a deal with The Walt Disney Company and ABC to produce programs for the network, including Amas de Casa Desesperadas. The show is unique for the Spanish-language import of an English drama series, when Spanish-language television is well known for its telenovelas.

References

External links
 
 

2000s American comedy-drama television series
2008 American television series debuts
2008 American television series endings
Desperate Housewives
Univision original programming
Television series by Pol-ka Producciones
Serial drama television series
American television soap operas
Spanish-language American telenovelas